Nou Neou, also known as Mrs Ung Mung was a Cambodian politician.

She was Undersecretary of State for Tourism in 1966–1970. As such she was one of the first women in Cambodia to be appointed to a senior political office, after Tong Siv Eng and Diep Dinar.

She served as Chair of the Cambodian Women’s Association. As the Chair of the Patriotic Women’s Youth Commandos, she helped organise the mobilisation of the women against the Khmer Rouge during the Cambodian civil war.

References

Government ministers of Cambodia
Women government ministers of Cambodia
20th-century Cambodian women politicians
20th-century Cambodian politicians